Stamnodini is a tribe of geometer moths under subfamily Larentiinae.

Genera
 Heterusia Hübner, 1827-31
 Stamnoctenis Warren, 1901
 Stamnodes Guenée, [1858]

References

 
Larentiinae